Layos is a municipality located in the province of Toledo, Castile-La Mancha, Spain. According to the 2006 census (INE), the municipality has a population of 378 inhabitants. In Layos in 1627 it was found the paleochristian sarcophagus named Layos Sarcophagus.

References

Municipalities in the Province of Toledo